Moullava digyna, the Teri pod, is a plant species in the genus Moullava.

A large scandant sparingly prickly shrub. Branches glabrous or slightly downy, pinnae 5–9 pair. Leaflets obtuse, pale beneath, 8–10 pairs, 6–12 mm long. Flowers in simple axillary racemes, 25–30 cm long, pedicels slender 2.5 cm.long, petals orbicular, yellow, the upper streaked with red, filaments densely wooly in the lower half. Pod oblong, turgid, 3–5 cm long, seeds 2–4.
Distribution: Assam, Bengal, Chittagong, Myanmar, Ceylon, Malay Peninsula and Archipelago.
Vernacular name : Su-let-thi - Burm.

References

External links

 Caesalpinia digyna on www.worldagroforestry.org

Caesalpinieae